Avid College is a private educational institution located in Malé, Maldives.

References

Schools in the Maldives